Noel Gibbons (born 1 December 1956 in Bermuda) is a former Bermudian cricketer. He was a right-handed batsman and right-arm medium pace bowler. He played one first-class match for Bermuda, against New Zealand in 1972, scoring five runs in the match. It was the maiden first-class match to be played by the Bermuda cricket team.

His greatest success came in the ICC Trophy, where he had a fine all-round career. In 34 matches he scored 631 runs at an average of 30.04. His top score of 125 not out against Hong Kong in 1986 is the third highest for Bermuda in the ICC Trophy. He also took 42 wickets at an average of 22.85. Only four players have taken more wickets in the history of the tournament.

As of 2006, he is still active in Bermudian domestic cricket.

References

External links
Cricket Archive profile
Cricinfo profile

1956 births
Living people
Bermudian cricketers